Microbotryaceae is a family of Basidiomycota fungi in the order Microbotryales.

References

External links

Microbotryales
Microbotryaceae